Fistful of Flies is a 1997 Australian film directed by Monica Pellizzari and starring Tasma Walton.

It screened at the Sundance Film Festival.

References

External links

Fistful of Flies at Urban Cinefile 
Fistful of Flies at Oz Movies

Australian thriller drama films
1990s English-language films
1990s Australian films